Michel Bouvier (born September 14, 1958) is a Canadian biochemist and molecular pharmacologist. He is a professor of biochemistry and molecular medicine at Université de Montréal; a principal investigator and the chief executive officer at the Institute for Research in Immunology and Cancer; and an associate vice-president in Research, Scientific Discovery, Creation, and Innovation at Université de Montréal. His work focuses on the study of cell signaling towards the discovery of new pharmaceutical drugs.

Biography 
Michel Bouvier earned a B.Sc. in biochemistry (1979) and a Ph.D. in neurological sciences (1985) from Université de Montréal, and then completed a postdoctoral fellowship (1985-1989) at Duke University under the supervision of Robert Lefkowitz (2012 Nobel Prize in Chemistry). Bouvier is a professor in the Department of Biochemistry and Molecular Medicine at the Faculty of Medicine of Université de Montréal and a principal investigator at the Institute for Research in Immunology and Cancer at Université de Montréal.

Research 
He is a world-known expert in cell signaling and drug discovery, notably in the field of G protein-coupled receptors (GPCRs), which constitute the largest single protein family involved in the transduction of hormonal signals and neurotransmitters. Their physiological significance makes them prime targets in drug development, and over a third of existing drugs use GPCRs as their target site of action. Bouvier's work in the regulation of receptors led to new paradigms (inverse agonism; pharmacological chaperones; receptor polymerization; and pluridimensionality of signaling), which, coupled with the development of bioluminescence resonance energy transfer-based methods, have a direct impact on drug discovery. He has authored over 260 scientific articles, filed 36 patent applications, and delivered over 400 lectures as a guest lecturer. Bouvier holds the Canada Research Chair in Signal Transduction and Molecular Pharmacology.

Honours 

 2021 - Killam Prize in health sciences
 2017 - Wilder-Penfield Prize
 2017 - Julius Axelrod pharmacology prize of the American Society for Pharmacology and Experimental Therapeutics
 2014 - Member of the Royal Society of Canada
 2011 - Adrien-Pouliot Prize - Association francophone pour le savoir (Acfas)
 2006 - Léo-Pariseau Prize (Acfas)
 2005 - Fellow of the Canadian Academy of Health Sciences

References

External links 
Curriculum vitae, Institute for Research in Immunology and Cancer at the Université de Montréal
Michel Bouvier's lab

1958 births
Living people
Canadian biochemists
Academic staff of the Université de Montréal
Université de Montréal alumni
Fellows of the Royal Society of Canada